Luther Martin Strong (June 23, 1838 – April 26, 1903) was an American lawyer, jurist, and veteran of the Civil War who served two terms as a U.S. Representative from Ohio from 1893 to 1897.

Biography 
Born near Tiffin, Ohio, Strong attended the common schools and Aaron Schuyler's Academy, Republic, Ohio.
He taught school.

He enlisted in the Forty-ninth Regiment, Ohio Volunteer Infantry, in 1861 and served until March 13, 1865.

He studied law and was admitted to the bar by the Supreme Court of Ohio on January 30, 1867.
He moved to Kenton and practiced his profession.
He served as member of the board of education.

He was elected to the State senate in 1879 and 1881.
He was appointed judge of the court of common pleas by Governor Foster in 1883 to fill an unexpired term.

Congress 
Strong was elected as a Republican to the Fifty-third and Fifty-fourth Congresses (March 4, 1893 – March 3, 1897).
He was an unsuccessful candidate for renomination in 1896 to the Fifty-fifth Congress.

Later career and death 
He engaged in agricultural pursuits.

He died in Kenton, Ohio, April 26, 1903.
He was interred in Grove Cemetery.

Sources

External links

 

1838 births
1903 deaths
Ohio state court judges
Republican Party Ohio state senators
People from Kenton, Ohio
People of Ohio in the American Civil War
Union Army officers
19th-century American politicians
People from Tiffin, Ohio
19th-century American judges
Republican Party members of the United States House of Representatives from Ohio